The 2018–19 Primera División Femenina de Fútbol was the 31st edition of Spain's highest women's football league. The season started on 3 September 2018 and ended on 11 May 2019. Atlético Madrid won their third consecutive title.

Teams

Málaga and Logroño joined the league after earning promotion at the conclusion of the 2017–18 Segunda División.

Stadia and locations

Personnel and sponsorship

Managerial changes

List of foreign players
(Italic)Players has come in Winter transfer

Athletic Club
 'no foreign players'
Ex foreign players:
Summer
 THERE ISNT ANY
Winter
 THERE ISNT ANY

Atlético de Madrid
  Jennifer Oehrli
  Elena Linari
  Kenti Robles
  Dolores Silva
  Ludmilla
  Alex Chidiac
  Aïssatou Tounkara
  Viola Calligaris
Ex foreign players:
Summer
 THERE ISNT ANY
Winter
 THERE ISNT ANY

Barcelona
  Stefanie van der Gragt
  Pamela Tajonar
  Toni Duggan
  Kheira Hamraoui
  Asisat Oshoala
  Nataša Andonova
  Lieke Martens
Ex foreign players:
Summer
 THERE ISN'T ANY
Winter
  Elise Bussaglia

Betis
  Emily Dolan
  Merel van Dongen
  Erina Yamane
  Yaiza Relea Ramos
  Marianela Szymanowski
Ex foreign players:
Summer
 THERE ISN'T ANY
Winter
 THERE ISN'T ANY

Espanyol
  Ayaki Shinada
  Dulce Quintana
  Katherine Alvarado
Ex foreign players:
Summer
 THERE ISN'T ANY
Winter
 THERE ISN'T ANY

Fundación Albacete
  Hitomi Yama
  Tomo Matsukawa
  Slađana Bulatović
  Sandra Luzardo
  Eva Vamberger
Ex foreign players:
Summer
  Annia Mejia
  Vanesa Córdoba
Winter
 THERE ISN'T ANY

Granadilla
  Ange N'Guessan
  Tatiana Matveeva
  Joyce
  Aline Reis
  Raissa Feudjio
  Nayluisa Cáceres
Ex foreign players:
Summer
  Ayano Dozono
  Liucija Vaitukaitytė
  Jackie Simpson
Winter
 THERE ISN'T ANY

Levante
  Charlyn Corral
  Andreea Părăluță
  Aivi Luik
  Estefanía Banini
  Charlyn Corral
Ex foreign players:
Summer
 THERE ISNT ANY
Winter
 THERE ISNT ANY

Logroño
  Ámbar Soruco
  Vanesa Santana
  Jade Boho Sayo
  Barbra Banda
  Nágela
  Ida Guehai
  Claire Falknor
  Dorine Chuigoué
  Cami Privett
  Fatou Kanteh
Ex foreign players:
Summer
 THERE ISNT ANY
Winter
 THERE ISNT ANY

Madrid CFF
  Agustina Barroso
  Eunice Beckmann
  Ana Lucía Martínez
  Yasmin Mrabet
Ex foreign players:
Summer
 THERE ISNT ANY
Winter
 THERE ISNT ANY

Málaga
  Chelsea Ashurst
  Bassira Toure
  Pamela González
  Mayara Bordin
  Ode Fulutudilu
  Armisa Kuč
  Minori Chiba
  Dominika Čonč
  Stefany Castaño
  Gaëlle Enganamouit
Ex foreign players:
Summer
  Natalia Gómez Junco
  Siobhan Marie Wilson
Winter
 THERE ISN'T ANY

Rayo Vallecano
  Carla Guerrero
  Yael Oviedo
  Oriana Altuve
  Camila Sáez
  Jelena Čubrilo
  Marta Perarnau
Ex foreign players:
Summer
 THERE ISN'T ANY
Winter
 THERE ISN'T ANY

Real Sociedad
  Kiana Palacios
Ex foreign players:
Summer
 THERE ISNT ANY
Winter
 THERE ISNT ANY

Sevilla
  Isadora Haas Gehlen
  Toni Payne
  Karen Ayana
  Aldana Cometti
  Francisco Lara
  Liucija Vaitukaitytė
  Nadezhda Karpova
Ex foreign players:
Summer
 THERE ISNT ANY
Winter
 THERE ISNT ANY

Sporting de Huelva
  Geraldine Leyton
  Elena Pavel
  Meryem Hajri
  Yulia Kornievets
  Lice Chamorro
  Florencia Bonsegundo
  Albina Formchenko
  Ludmila Barbosa da Silva
  Yessenia López
  Raquel Fernandes
  Monica Bitencourt
  Vera Djatel
Ex foreign players:
Summer
  Geraldine Leyton
  Bárbara Santibáñez
Winter
 THERE ISNT ANY

Valencia
  Mandy van der Berg
  Mónica Flores
  Zenatha Coleman
  Yanara Aedo
  Jennifer Vreugdenhill
  Natalia Gaitán
Ex foreign players:
Summer
  Nadezhda Karpova
Winter
 THERE ISNT ANY

League table

Results

Season statistics

Top goalscorers

Hat-tricks

4 Player scored 4 goals

Best goalkeepers

Player of the week

Notable attendances
60,739 Atlético de Madrid 0–2 Barcelona (17 March 2019 at Wanda Metropolitano; world record in a match of women's football between clubs)
24,986 Athletic Club 2–0 Levante (31 March 2019 at San Mamés)
23,812 Betis 1–1 Sevilla (13 April 2019 at Estadio Benito Villamarín)
21,234 Real Sociedad 2–2 Athletic Club (10 February 2019 at Anoeta)
20,615 Espanyol 0–1 Atlético de Madrid (22 April 2019 at RCDE Stadium)
20,198 Levante 0–0 Valencia (9 December 2018 at Ciutat de València)

Best XI of the Season

On 27 June 2016, La Liga named their best XI of the 2018-19 Primera Division season.

References

External links
Primera División (women) at La Liga 
RFEF Official Website 

2018-19
Spa
1
women's